Marc Kelly Smith (born 1949) is an American poet and founder of the poetry slam movement, for which he received the nickname Slam Papi.

Smith was born in 1949 and grew up on the southeast side of Chicago. He attended/graduated Charles P. Caldwell Elementary School and James H. Bowen High School. Smith spent most of his young life as a construction worker, but has written poetry since he was 19. He considers himself a socialist.

Uptown Poetry Slam
Smith started at an open mic night at the Get Me High lounge in November 1984 called the Monday Night Poetry Reading. Even as poets scoffed at artists "performing" their work, rather than gently "reading" it, the event grew in popularity. Smith saw his approach as an "up yours" to establishment poets he considered snooty and effete, because at their events, "no one was listening".

According to Smith, who once attended a conventional reading with his manuscripts concealed inside a newspaper, 

With a like-minded troupe, Smith hosted the first poetry slam at the Get Me High Lounge in the Bucktown neighborhood in 1986. The event soon migrated to the Green Mill, a tavern and jazz lounge in Chicago's Uptown neighborhood, where it has remained ever since. Other poets in the first slam were Mike Barrett, Rob Van Tuyle, Jean Howard, Anna Brown, Karen Nystrom, Dave Cooper, and John Sheehan, all fellow members of the Chicago Poetry Ensemble. According to Smith, the first slam was more variety show than competition. Though all slams vary in format, Smith is considered responsible for key features, including the selection of judges from the audience and cash prizes.

As stated in the PBS television series, The United States of Poetry, a "strand of new poetry began at Chicago's Green Mill Tavern in 1987 when Marc Smith found a home for the Poetry Slam." Smith had found a crowd-inclusive, entertaining method for nurturing the poetry scene. Since then, the poetry slam has spread throughout the world, exported to over 500 cities large and small.

In the book, Words in Your Face: A Guided Tour Through Twenty Years of the New York City Poetry Slam, author Cristin O'Keefe Aptowicz describes the influential Smith:

Since July 1986, Smith has run the Uptown Poetry Slam, a three-hour show featuring an open mic (1 hour), feature—poet or professional touring act (1 hour), and the poetry slam. It is the longest-running, weekly poetry show in the country, and one of the longest-running shows in Chicago history.

In 1990, the first National Poetry Slam was held in San Francisco (with three city teams attending including Chicago and New York City), and has continued to rotate among cities. The National Poetry Slam currently sees over 80 teams of poets vying for the title.

Over the years, Smith has turned down offers to commercialize the slam, including movie offers and bids for corporate sponsorship. Smith says that what he considers to be Slam's increased commercial exploitation, and Def Poetry Jam in particular, as having "diminished the value and aesthetic of performance poetry." This, combined with a continuing lack of Slam's recognition by "big literature festivals and institutions" in America, has led Smith to become more invested in performance poetry in Europe, where he says the "audiences are growing over there. And the aesthetic is growing and evolving."

Smith has published several books about the poetry slam movement, as well as publishing two books of his own work. He tours extensively, performing his own, blue-collar, Carl Sandburg-influenced poetry and hosting poetry slams. He also tours with a show titled Sandburg to Smith-Smith to Sandburg, which combines the work of both poets with live jazz.

Backlash at CUPSI 
In 2017, Smith was invited to perform at the College Unions Poetry Slam Invitational finals in honor of the claim that "Smith founded slam poetry" in Chicago. The audience was polite and compliant at the start of Smith's set. Then, two poems in, many audience members rapidly left the auditorium while others formed a human wall with their backs to the stage, holding their arms in an X across their chests.

This protest occurred during Smith's poems, "Speaksters", "Old White Guy Whitey", and "Detention Center". At one point, Smith said to the audience, “Oh this is great, are you done yet?” before walking off the stage.

According to Chicago Defender, after Smith's exit from the stage, "outside of the back room, in a moment of DJ genius, Chance The Rapper’s “You Don’t Want No Problem” started blaring from the speakers." Chance The Rapper grew up in the Chicago poetry and rap scenes. No Problem, similar to the CUPSI protest, was written as a warning and dissent to institutions that exploit artists.

After the competition, Poetry Slam Inc. issued a statement demonstrating disapproval of Smith’s CUPSI performance, and barring him from being involved in the 2018 National Poetry Slam in Chicago. Button Poetry issued a statement that said, "Not only are we all appalled by the ‘work’ and behavior of the feature, Marc Smith, we refuse to support or endorse said poetry in any fashion."

Reacting to the CUPSI protest, Dominique Christina said, "[Marc] is a white man who came up with a gimmick that POC fucking dominate and he isn’t all that happy about it and wants, at the very least for us to kiss his ring and be ingratiating. When he reads those poems in those spaces that’s not a blind spot. That’s an act of aggression…”

In response to Smith's set, Caitlyn Clark wrote a poem and posted it to Twitter, titled, "OLD WHITE GUY WHITEY WALKS INTO A BAR". The piece featured lines such as, "marc smith leaves the stage when his poems about reverse racism are not received with the same open arms as his home" and "isn't that the greatest privilege? writing poems about your blood instead of having others write poems in it?"

Reflecting on the event, Isaiah Frost, an attendee of the event, wrote, "The implication of Smith, a cisgender white man, performing these pieces to an audience of largely queer/gender-nonconforming people of color was clear to the poets—they felt that Smith was patronizing them, invalidating their struggles, reducing their grievances to mere petty complaints. Because of this message, a protest emerged, in which teams turned their backs on Smith’s performance… literally."

Bibliography
By Someone's Good Grace, CD 1993, Publisher Splinter Group Chicago
Crowdpleaser, 1996, Publisher Jeff Helgeson
The Spoken Word Revolution, 2003, Publisher Sourcebooks Publishing, advisor to the book/narrator of CD portion
The Complete Idiot's Guide to Slam Poetry, 2004, Penguin/Alpha Press (co-written with Joe Kraynak)
The Spoken Word Revolution Redux, 2006, Publisher Sourcebooks Publishing, narrator of CD portion
Quarters in the Jukebox, CD, 2006, Publisher EM Press (www.em-press.com), live and studio tracks, with bands and solo

Filmography
SlamNation - 1998, directed by Paul Devlin
Sunday Night Poets - 2002, directed by David Rorie, Pugi Films distributed by National Film Network
Histoire de dires - 2008, documentary directed by Yann Francès & Matthieu Chevallier - produced by Vivement lundi !

References

External links
Personal home page
slampapi.com
Audio of "Money," "El Train Medley" and "In Clifton" from the Indiefeed Performance Poetry Channel

American male poets
Slam poets
Place of birth missing (living people)
Writers from Chicago
1949 births
Living people